Hyssus or Hyssos, also known as Hyssi portus, or Susarmia or Sousarmia (Σουσάρμια), or Susurmaena or Sousourmaina (Σουσούρμαινα), was a port-town of ancient Pontus on the Black Sea coast, at the mouth of the Hyssus River, 180 stadia east of Trapezus. The Tabula Peutingeriana calls it Hyssilime. It seems to have been a place of some importance; for it was fortified, and had the "cohors Apuleia civium Romanorum" for its garrison. Other names borne by the town include Psoron Limen (Ψωρῶν λιμήν), Sousourmena, and Ysiporto.

Its site is located near Araklıçarşısı in Asiatic Turkey.

References

Populated places in ancient Pontus
Former populated places in Turkey
History of Trabzon Province